Charles Gilbert Sower (21 November 1821, Norristown, Pennsylvania – 23 March 1902) was a printer and publisher in Philadelphia.

Biography
He was the great grandson of Christopher Sower the younger, and inherited the family printing and publishing operations. He moved the establishment to Philadelphia in 1844, where he continued publishing, first in his own name, then successively as Sower and Barnes, then as Sower, Barnes and Potts, and then as Sower, Potts and Co. In 1888, 150 years after it was founded by Christopher Sower the elder, the house was incorporated as the Christopher Sower Company by a charter granted by Pennsylvania. In the late 19th century, Charles Gilbert Sower was still president of the company.

References

1821 births
1902 deaths
American printers
American publishers (people)
Businesspeople from Philadelphia
19th-century American businesspeople